Gorham Airport  is a private airport located in Gorham, New Hampshire, one mile (1.6 km) north-west of the central business district (CBD) of Gorham, in Coos County, New Hampshire, USA. Due to its proximity to Mt. Washington, the airport has been used to support glider flights exploring the wave system of the Presidential, Sandwich, Carter-Moriah, Pilot, Kinsman and Mahoosuc ranges in northern New Hampshire.

Airlines and destinations 
There are no commercial flights available.

See also
List of airports in New Hampshire

References

External links 

Airports in New Hampshire
Transportation buildings and structures in Coös County, New Hampshire
Gorham, New Hampshire